The Glynn County School District is a public school district in Glynn County, Georgia, United States, based in Brunswick. It serves the communities of Brunswick, Country Club Estates, Dock Junction, Everett, St. Simons Island, and Sterling.

History

By 1963 the board of education had ruled that African-American students should attend high schools which previously did not admit children of their race.

In 1999 the school district voted to find a method of having the Ten Commandments legally displayed on district properties which would hold up under legal challenges; the proposal had displaying the Ten Commandments with other historical documents.

Board of Education
(GSBA) 2018 Distinguished School Board

Schools
The Glynn County School District has ten elementary schools, four middle schools, and two high schools.

Elementary schools
Altama Elementary School
Burroughs-Molette Elementary School
Glyndale Elementary School
Golden Isles Elementary School
Goodyear Elementary School
C.B. Greer Elementary School
Oglethorpe Point Elementary School
Satilla Marsh Elementary School
St. Simons Elementary School
Sterling Elementary School

Middle schools
Glynn Middle School
Jane Macon Middle School
Needwood Middle School
Risley Middle School

High schools
Brunswick High School
Glynn Academy

References

External links

School districts in Georgia (U.S. state)
Education in Glynn County, Georgia